{{about|the miniseries|the soundtrack|Liberty! (album)Liberty! (album)|the play|Liberty! The Saga of Sycamore ShoalsLiberty! The Saga of Sycamore Shoals}}Liberty! The American Revolution is a six-hour documentary miniseries about the Revolutionary War, and the instigating factors, that brought about the United States' independence from the Kingdom of Great Britain. It was first broadcast on the Public Broadcasting Service in 1997.

The series consists of six hour-long episodes. Each episode is introduced by Forrest Sawyer and narrated by Edward Herrmann. Period photographs and location filming are intercut with stage and screen actors in appropriate period costume reading as figures of the time, including Campbell Scott (Thomas Jefferson), Philip Bosco (Benjamin Franklin), Victor Garber (John Dickinson), Alex Jennings (King George III), Roger Rees (Thomas Paine), Philip Seymour Hoffman (Joseph Plumb Martin), Terrence Mann (Gen. John Burgoyne), Colm Feore (Alexander Hamilton), Sebastian Roché (The Marquis de Lafayette), Donna Murphy (Abigail Adams), Austin Pendleton (Benjamin Rush) and Peter Donaldson (John Adams). Stephen Lang read the words of George Washington, but is not seen on camera.

British and American historians and authors, including Carol Berkin, Bernard Bailyn, Ron Hoffman, Claude-Anne Lopez, Pauline Maier, George C. Neumann,  Richard Norton Smith, Gordon S. Wood (U.S.) and Jeremy Black, Colin Bonwick, John Keegan, and N.A.M. Rodger (U.K.) add historical background, explaining life and society of the time while interpreting events from the perspectives of the two sides of the conflict. Historical perspectives also include the status of black slaves and freemen, the participation of American Indians, and the strivings of American women as events progress.

Episodes
 "The Reluctant Revolutionaries" (1763-1774): Introduction of the major players, life as British colonists, the Stamp Act, The Declaratory Act, the Boston Massacre, taxation without representation, The Boston Tea Party
 "Blows Must Decide" (1774-1776): The Coersive/Intolerable Acts, military reinforcement of Boston, the first Continental Congress, the battles of Lexington and Concord and the Battle of Bunker Hill, loyalists and the Olive Branch Petition, Common Sense, The Declaration of Independence
 "The Times That Try Men's Souls" (1776-1777): The British army arrives under General Howe, Washington's formation of an American army, division of colonies as patriot or loyalist, the defense of New York, fall of New Jersey, The American Crisis, the crossing of the Delaware River and the Battle of Trenton
 "Oh Fatal Ambition!" (1777-1778):  Benjamin Franklin appeals for French assistance, Gen. Burgoyne's incursion from the north and the fall of Fort Ticonderoga, the war in New England, the Battle of Brandywine Creek, the Battle of Saratoga and Burgoyne's surrender, America signs a treaty with the French
 "The World Turned Upside Down" (1778-1783): The French alliance, Gen. Clinton's campaign in the south, the siege of Charleston, Gen. Cornwallis's strategy to conquer the south, Benedict Arnold joins the British, French troops under Gen. Rochambeau reinforce Washington's army, Gen. Nathanael Greene reclaims the south, the Battle of Yorktown, the British surrender
  "Are We to Be a Nation?" (1783-1788): Creating the new nation, Washington resigns his commission, Noah Webster standardizes American English, Shays' Rebellion, the Confederation Congress, Alexander Hamilton and James Madison envision a new system of government, the Constitution, Bill of Rights and formation of a central government

American singer-songwriter James Taylor sings the traditional song "Johnny Has Gone for a Soldier" during the end credits. Original music was composed by violinist Mark O'Connor, who accompanies Taylor; the score, which blends new and traditional music, was performed by O'Connor, Taylor, cellist Yo-Yo Ma, trumpet player Wynton Marsalis and the Nashville Symphony.  A collection of the music from the soundtrack was released as a companion album in 1997.Liberty! was produced for Public Broadcasting Service (PBS) by Twin Cities Public Television (TPT), and won a George Foster Peabody Award. The directors were Ellen Hovde and Muffie Meyer, who also collaborated on the 2002 TPT production Benjamin Franklin''.

External links

PBS: Liberty! The American Revolution

1997 films
Peabody Award-winning television programs
1990s American television miniseries
Television series about the American Revolution
Cultural depictions of Thomas Jefferson
Cultural depictions of Benjamin Franklin
Cultural depictions of George Washington
Cultural depictions of George III
Cultural depictions of Thomas Paine
Cultural depictions of Alexander Hamilton
Cultural depictions of Gilbert du Motier, Marquis de Lafayette
Cultural depictions of Benedict Arnold
Cultural depictions of James Madison
1990s English-language films